Callambulyx is a genus of moths in the family Sphingidae first described by Walter Rothschild and Karl Jordan in 1903.

Species
Callambulyx amanda Rothschild & Jordan 1903
Callambulyx junonia (Butler 1881)
Callambulyx kitchingi Cadiou 1996
Callambulyx poecilus (Rothschild 1898)
Callambulyx rubricosa (Walker 1856)
Callambulyx rubricosa piepersi (Snellen, 1880)
Callambulyx schintlmeisteri Brechlin 1997
Callambulyx sichangensis Chu & Wang, 1980
Callambulyx sinjaevi Brechlin, 2000
Callambulyx tatarinovii (Bremer & Grey 1853)
Callambulyx tatarinovii formosana Clark, 1935 
Callambulyx tatarinovii gabyae Bryk, 1946

Gallery

References

 
Smerinthini
Moth genera
Taxa named by Walter Rothschild
Taxa named by Karl Jordan